Brissopsis lyrifera is a species of sea urchins of the family Brissidae. Their armour is covered with spines. It was first described by the British naturalist Edward Forbes in 1841. This species of sea urchin is a nonselective, infaunal deposit feeder.

References 

Animals described in 1841
lyrifera
Taxa named by Edward Forbes